Francis Plumerel (born 18 November 1917, date of death unknown) was a Belgian modern pentathlete. He competed at the 1952 Summer Olympics.

References

1917 births
Year of death missing
Belgian male modern pentathletes
Olympic modern pentathletes of Belgium
Modern pentathletes at the 1952 Summer Olympics